Desmond H Lukehurst (born 3 October 1937) known as Des Lukehurst is a former speedway rider from England.

Speedway career 
Lukehurst rode in the top two tiers of British Speedway from 1965 to 1970, riding for various clubs. In 1969, he topped the league averages during the 1969 British League Division Two season.

References 

Living people
1937 births
British speedway riders
Exeter Falcons riders
Hackney Hawks riders
Newport Wasps riders
Oxford Cheetahs riders
Romford Bombers riders
Swindon Robins riders
Wembley Lions riders
West Ham Hammers riders
Wolverhampton Wolves riders